TMI News is a South Korean news variety show that airs on Mnet.

The show aired on Thursday at 20:00 (KST) starting from April 25, 2019 until May 30, 2019. It then went on a hiatus without notice, but returned on July 31, 2019 and currently airs on every Wednesday at 20:00 (KST). The show had a hiatus after the episode on November 27, 2019, and returned again starting January 15, 2020 to August 26, 2020. The show made another return beginning March 10, 2021, as a new season, and concluded on September 29, 2021.

A new series related to the show, TMI News Show, began airing from February 9, 2022.

Program
The show is the first ever global K-pop idols' news & talk show. The "TMI" in the show's name stands for Thursday Mnet Idol. The show had requested for any possible TMI (Too Much Information) information from the public about the idol groups or their individual members through their online form, and the information that will be used for the show is "news reported" on the show.

From episode 7, the show was revamped into a chart show. In each episode, one or two topics are discussed, and celebrities (or items/programs/situations/places/songs) are ranked according to the topic. If only one topic is discussed in an episode, ten or fourteen celebrities (or items/programs/situations/places/songs) will be listed out, and if two topics are discussed in an episode, seven per topic will be listed.

Cast

Current

Former

Episodes (Season 1)

2019

2020

Episodes (Season 2 - 2021)

Notes

References

South Korean television news shows
Korean-language television shows
2019 South Korean television series debuts